This is a list of exceptional white dwarf stars.

Firsts
These were the first white dwarfs discovered fitting these conditions

Extremes
These are the white dwarfs which are currently known to fit these conditions

Nearest

Notes
SDSS J1228+1040, A white dwarf with disk of debris.

References

See also

 Lists of astronomical objects
 Lists of stars

White dwarfs
list